Chakwal (Punjabi and ) is a city in Chakwal District, in the Potohar region of Punjab, Pakistan. 

It is the 66th largest city of Pakistan by population. Chakwal is located 90 kilometres south-west of the federal capital, Islamabad and 270 kilometres from the provincial capital, Lahore. It is most closely accessible by both the Islamabad International Airport as well as  the Lahore International Airport.

History 
Chakwal district is located in the Dhanni Region of the Potohar in northern Punjab, Pakistan. Chakwal district is also famous for making Zari shoes and the traditional craft is Khes weaving.

It is believed that the name of the city "Chakwal" is derived from "Chako Khan", a noble person.  For many early years, this region was under the reign of Dogras and Khokhars. In Moghul emperor Babar’s time seven tribes called Awans, Waince, Mair Minhas, Khokhar, Bhatti, Mughal Kassar and Kahut Quriesh were settled in this region.

Chakwal is also known as the land of honor or the land of army people due to a lot of people servicing in army and all defense forces. One of major Notable person is Lance Havaldar Laal Khan who was awarded Tamgha-i-Jurat (Baloch Regiment), TJ, 1958. He belongs to Sardhi village later he moved to 25 Pull town Shorkot city.

Geography
Chakwal's landscape features the canyons in Thirchak-Mahal. There are man-made and natural lakes around the city in neighbouring communities.

Chakwal is mainly an agriculture area. Currently Chakwal is famous for production of international standard oranges, wheat, barley, sugarcane, and many other fruits and vegetables. Many international cement companies have planted their factories around the city whose success versace environmental issues are debatable.

Administration
Chakwal was created as an independent district of Rawalpindi in 1985 by combining sub division Chakwal of district Jhelum, sub division Talagang of district Attock and the police station Choa Saidan Shah, carved out of sub division Pind Dadan Khan of district Jhelum.

In addition to being the district headquarters, Chakwal city is also the administrative centre of Chakwal tehsil (a subdivision of the district). The Chakwal District is divided into three Tehsils, namely, Kalar-Kahar, Choa Saidan Shah and Chakwal itself. The city of Chakwal itself is divided into five Union councils: and Chakwal district is divided into 68 union councils.

Notable people

 Sub. Abdul Khaliq (23 March 1933 – 10 March 1988), Fastest Man of Asia, Flying Bird of Asia, Olympian, Pride of Performance (Presidential Award) holder
 Ayaz Amir, journalist, columnist, and a senior politician
 Fozia Behram, politician
 Talib Chakwali (1900–1988), Indian Urdu poet
 Sadaf Hussain, cricketer
 Colonel Imam (died January 2011), member of Special Service Group (SSG) and Inter Services Intelligence (ISI) of Pakistan Army
 Sardar Zulfiqar Ali Khan Dullah, politician
 Iftikhar Khan (10 January 1907 – 13 December 1949), designated to become the first Commander-in-Chief of Pakistan Army, died in air crash.
 Khudadad Khan (20 October 1888 – 8 March 1971), was the first South Asian recipient of the Victoria Cross.
 Muhammad Khan (1910 – 23 October 1999), writer and veteran of WW II
 Yahya Khan (4 February 1917 – 10 August 1980), third President of Pakistan
 Allah Bakhsh Malik, academic, researcher, development economist, social scientist, management and institutional development specialist
 Faiz Hameed, Director-General of Inter-Services Intelligence
 Madan Mohan, music director of India
 Malik Munawar Khan Awan, Major rank officer in the Pakistan Army
 Lt. General Abdul Qayyum, retired three-star General
 Raja Yasir Humayun Sarfraz, Minister of Education and IT, Punjab
 Manmohan Singh, former Prime Minister of India
 Awais Zia, cricketer

See also
 List of Cities of Punjab, Pakistan by Area
 Chattal
 Kakazai
 Karuli
 Khanpur, Chakwal
 Mulhal Mughlan
 Sadwal
 Talagang

References

External links

Populated places in Chakwal District
Cities in Punjab (Pakistan)